Kim Bong-hwan (born 4 July 1939) is a North Korean football forward who played for North Korea in the 1966 FIFA World Cup. He also played for Kikwancha Pyongyang.

References

1939 births
North Korean footballers
North Korea international footballers
Association football forwards
1966 FIFA World Cup players
Living people